Gun laws in Oregon regulate the manufacture, sale, possession, and use of firearms and ammunition in the state of Oregon in the United States.

In the November 8, 2022 general election, voters approved Oregon Ballot Measure 114, with about 50.6% voting in favor and 49.4% opposed.  The measure creates a new permit that would be required to purchase or acquire a firearm.  County sheriffs would accept permit applications, and the state police would conduct background checks, which would be stricter than the current checks.  Applicants would need to complete an approved training course, submit fingerprints, and pay a $65 fee.  Additionally, the ballot measure bans the sale, transfer, or importation of magazines that can hold more than ten rounds of ammunition.  There have been a number of legal challenges to these provisions, and several judicial rulings have blocked the implementation of Ballot Measure 114 for now.

Summary table

Concealed and open carry 
Oregon is a shall-issue concealed-carry state. and is notable for having very few restrictions on where a concealed firearm may be carried. Oregon also has statewide preemption for its concealed-carry laws—with limited exceptions, counties and cities cannot place limits on the ability of people to carry concealed weapons beyond those provided by state law.

There is one possible exception to the "shall issue" state. The concealed-carry license is issued by each county's sheriff, and is valid statewide. The sheriff is given personal discretion if that sheriff "has reasonable grounds to believe that the applicant has been or is reasonably likely to be a danger to self or others." There is no pure definition of what that reason must be. For instance it might be a statement from another law enforcement officer about an individual, and that statement might come from personal acquaintance. The burden, and perhaps the right to recover damages would then be on the applicant. 

There is no reciprocity with other states' concealed handgun licenses. Individuals wanting to carry a concealed handgun in Oregon will need an Oregon Concealed Handgun License. Though both residents and non-residents are allowed to open carry a handgun in Oregon without a permit.

Oregon is also an open-carry state with no permit being required to carry openly, but cities and counties are free to limit public possession of loaded firearms by individuals who do not have an Oregon Concealed Handgun License, those who do are exempt and allowed to open carry in these places. The cities of Portland, Beaverton, Tigard, Oregon City, Salem, and Independence, as well as Multnomah County have banned loaded firearms in all public places for those without a license.

Other laws 
In Oregon, the right to bear arms is protected by Article 1, Section 27 of the Oregon Constitution.

In Oregon, firearm owners can be held liable in civil court if a firearms injury is caused by negligence, and can be held responsible for damages in a wrongful death claim if the firearm is used to kill someone.

If a person appears to be a risk to themselves or to others, a police officer or the person's family or household member may petition the court for a one-year extreme risk protection order that would prohibit the person from possessing a deadly weapon.  If a judge finds clear and convincing evidence that the person is in imminent danger of hurting themselves or another person, the respondent would have 24 hours to surrender all deadly weapons.

It is illegal for someone to possess a firearm if they are under 18 years of age, were convicted of a felony, were convicted by a juvenile court of a crime which, if committed by an adult, would constitute a felony or a violent misdemeanor, were found to be mentally ill and were committed by the Department of Human Services, or are subject to an order from the Department of Human Services prohibiting them from possessing a firearm for mental health reasons.  Unlawful possession of a firearm is a Class A misdemeanor.

Hunting regulations 
Oregon Department of Fish and Wildlife implements specific regulations for which type of firearms are legal to use within the hunting season for a particular game species.

References 

Oregon law
Oregon